Seven minutes in heaven is a teenagers' party game.

Seven Minutes in Heaven may also refer to:
 Seven Minutes in Heaven (film), released 1985
 Seven Minutes in Heaven (play), first produced 2009
 7 Minutes in Heaven with Mike O'Brien, a web series created by Mike O'Brien (actor)
 7 Minutes In Heaven (Atavan Halen), song by Fall Out Boy (band)
 "Seven Minutes in Heaven" (Daredevil), an episode of Daredevil

A list containing many more products of this name in popular culture (sorted by year) you can find there.